The Scream is a painting by Edvard Munch.

The Scream may also refer to:
 The Scream (album), an album by Siouxsie & the Banshees
 The Scream (band), a 1990s American hard rock band
 "The Scream", a song by Poison from Native Tongue
 The Scream, a novel by Rohinton Mistry
 The Scream, a novel by John Skipp and Craig Spector

See also 
 Scream (disambiguation)
 Wilhelm scream, an often-used film sound effect